Nieuwoudt is an Afrikaans surname of topographic origin. It is an altered version of the originally Dutch surname Nieuhout/Nieuwhout with the meaning "new wood" (from Dutch nieuw "new" and hout "wood").
Notable people with this name include:
Gideon Nieuwoudt (1951–2005), former apartheid-era security policeman
Karl Nieuwoudt (born 1988), South African cricketer 
Luan Nieuwoudt (born 1995), South African rugby union player
Nicolaas Nieuwoudt (1929–1989), South African military commander
Stephanus Francois Nieuwoudt (born 1996), South African rugby union player
Teunis Nieuwoudt (born 1991), South African rugby union player
Janneman Nieuwoudt Malan  (born 1996), South African cricketer

See also
Nieuwoudtville, town in Northern Cape province of South Africa

References

Toponymic surnames
Afrikaans-language surnames